Тhe 2020 Liga 3 season was the forth one under its current name and 33rd since Georgia formed independent football league system in 1990.

Team changes
Five new members joined the league after the previous season. Tbilisi City and Spaeri gained promotion from Liga 4, while Guria Lanchkhuti, Kolkheti-1913 and Tskhinvali were relegated from the second division. The latter, though, having failed to meet the existing financial commitments, were expelled and replaced by Gareji Sagarejo, a third place team from the lower league.

Review
The teams played opening matches of the season in early March, but as COVID was raging, all sport activities were halted. The games resumed in late July. A two-round competition concluded in December with Gareji Sagarejo winning the league. Kolkheti-1913 finished second, while Gori prevailed in a battle for the third qualifying slot. But both failed in their promotion bid following their play-off performance. 

The two bottom teams were spared from relegation after some changes regarding the Liga 4 format for the next year were endorsed by Football Federation in February 2020.

Teams and stadiums

League table

Results

Regular season

Promotion play-offs

References

External links
Georgian Football Federation

Liga 3 (Georgia) seasons
3
Georgia
Georgia